The 2000 Standard Bank Triangular Tournament was a cricket tournament played in South Africa from 21 January to 13 February 2000. The three teams involved were South Africa, England and Zimbabwe. Each team played the others three times, with the two teams that won the most games playing each other in a final match. South Africa beat England by 38 runs in the final to win the competition.

1st Match: South Africa v Zimbabwe

2nd Match: South Africa v England

3rd Match: South Africa v England

4th Match: England v Zimbabwe

5th Match: England v Zimbabwe

6th Match: South Africa v Zimbabwe

7th Match: South Africa v England

8th Match: South Africa v Zimbabwe

9th Match: England v Zimbabwe

Final: South Africa v England

External links
Standard Bank Triangular Tournament at cricinfo.com

2000 in English cricket
2000 in South African cricket
2000 in Zimbabwean cricket
International cricket competitions from 1997–98 to 2000
South African cricket seasons from 1970–71 to 1999–2000
One Day International cricket competitions